McCamey High School is a public high school located in McCamey, Texas (USA) and classified as a 2A school by the UIL. It is part of the McCamey Independent School District located in extreme southwestern Upton County. In 2015, the school was rated "Met Standard" by the Texas Education Agency.

Athletics
The McCamey Badgers compete in the following sports - 

Baseball
Basketball
Cross Country
Football
Golf
Powerlifting
Softball
Tennis
Track and Field
Volleyball

State Titles
Boys Golf - 
1955(B), 1975(2A)

State Finalist
Football - 
2006(1A/D1)
One Act Play 
1954(B)

References

External links
McCamey ISD

Public high schools in Texas
Education in Upton County, Texas